Jane Wright (born 23 March 1955) is a Canadian former breaststroke swimmer. She competed in two events at the 1972 Summer Olympics.

References

External links
 

1955 births
Living people
Canadian female breaststroke swimmers
Olympic swimmers of Canada
Swimmers at the 1972 Summer Olympics
Swimmers from Toronto
Swimmers at the 1971 Pan American Games
Pan American Games gold medalists for Canada
Pan American Games silver medalists for Canada
Pan American Games medalists in swimming
Medalists at the 1971 Pan American Games
20th-century Canadian women